Mohammad Safadi (born 28 March 1944) is a Lebanese businessman who served as minister of finance under Najib Mikati between 2011 and 2014. He was also the minister of economy and trade from 2008 to 2011.

Early life and education
Safadi was born in Tripoli, Lebanon, on 28 March 1944 to Sunni family. His family are businesspeople, running their own firm in Tripoli.

He is a graduate of the American University of Beirut where he received a bachelor's degree in business administration in February 1968.

Business career
Safadi began his career in the private sector in Lebanon in 1969. In 1975 when the civil war broke out in Lebanon, he began to invest in Saudi Arabia. Therefore, he has many business investments in Saudi Arabia most of which included the construction of residential compounds.

He expanded his business across the Arab world and into Europe in Saudi Arabia. He also worked as business manager in London for Prince Turki bin Nasser, a member of House of Saud. Safadi established Safadi Group Holding in Lebanon in the 1990s.

Political career
Safadi was first elected to the Lebanese Parliament in 2000 as part of the Tripoli bloc. He served as the minister of public works and transport from 19 July 2005 to July 2008. Safadi also served as acting energy and water minister in 2007 and in 2008. Next, he was appointed minister of economy and trade on 11 July 2008 to the cabinet headed by Fouad Siniora. He was reelected member of parliament in the 2009 elections on the list of the March 14 alliance. Safadi was appointed minister of economy and trade to the cabinet of Saad Hariri on 9 November 2009, and his tenure lasted until June 2011.

Safadi did not support for Saad Hariri in the 2011 cabinet formation talks with Lebanese President Michel Suleiman. Instead, he voted for Najib Mikati during cabinet formation consultations in January 2011. Therefore, he broke with his March 14 allies and sided with the Hezbollah-led March 8 coalition along with Mikati. Safadi became an ally of Mikati after this event.

Safadi served as the minister of finance from 13 June 2011 to February 2014 in the cabinet led by Prime Minister Najib Mikati. Within the cabinet, Safadi was part of the group appointed by the Prime Minister and an independent or non-affiliated minister in the Mikati's cabinet. In October 2012, As Safir reported that Safadi would not participate in the 2013 parliamentary elections in Tripoli possibly due to health concerns.

Safadi chairs the steering committee of the Middle East Regional Technical Assistance Committee (METAC) of the International Monetary Fund. He was also the head of the Lebanese-German Parliamentary Friendship Committee and a member of the Economy Commission at the Parliament.

Safadi's term as finance minister ended in February 2014 when Ali Hassan Khalil was appointed to the post.

In November 2019, amidst the 2019–20 Lebanese protests, Safadi was tapped as the next Prime Minister of Lebanon, to succeed Saad Hariri. Safadi withdrew his candidacy on 16 November, stating that it would have been difficult to form a harmonious cabinet.

Controversy

The Guardian reported that Safadi involved in Al Yamama arms deal through an anonymous offshore company, Poseidon. The company was allegedly used to transfer money to Safadi, who was working for Prince Turki bin Nasser, Saudi royal and an air force officer at that time.

Personal life
On 5 October 2015, Safadi married Violette Khaïrallah. He has two children from a previous marriage. His son, Ramzi, died in a car crash in England on 10 March  2008.

Safadi established a foundation entitled the Safadi Foundation in 2000. It provides health, educational, and social services.

References

External links

20th-century Lebanese businesspeople
21st-century Lebanese businesspeople
1944 births
American University of Beirut alumni
Finance ministers of Lebanon
Economy and Trade ministers of Lebanon
Lebanese corporate directors
21st-century Lebanese politicians
Living people
Members of the Parliament of Lebanon
People from Tripoli, Lebanon
Future Movement politicians
Lebanese Sunni Muslims